Guancheng Subdistrict (a genus of sedges") is a subdistrict in Guangdong Province, China under the administration of Dongguan City. Guancheng was the old political and cultural centre of Dongguan, before the government moved to the new centre in the Nancheng Subdistrict.

History 
Guancheng Subdistrict has been home to the seat of Dongguan's government since 757 CE, during the early Tang Dynasty.

Upon the founding of the People's Republic of China in 1949, Guancheng was designated as a city. Guancheng was re-designated as a people's commune from 1958 to 1980.

In January 1988, Dongguan was upgraded to a prefecture-level city.

Geography 
Located near the center of Dongguan, the Guancheng Subdistrict encompasses the historic center of the city. The subdistrict lies 59 kilometers away from Guangzhou, 99 kilometers from Shenzhen, and 140 kilometers from Hong Kong.

Guancheng Subdistrict is bordered by Dongcheng Subdistrict, Nancheng Subdistrict, and Wanjiang Subdistrict.

Administrative divisions 
Guancheng Subdistrict is divided into 8 residential communities: Dongzheng Residential Community, Shiqiao Residential Community, Beiyu Residential Community, Xiyu Residential Community, Luosha Residential Community, Bosha Residential Community, Xingtang Residential Community, and Chuangye Residential Community.

Politics 
Guancheng Subdistrict used to be the political center of Dongguan City. The following is the list of political office-holders of Guancheng Subdistrict:

Economy 
As of 2019, the subdistrict's GDP totaled ¥21.595 billion, fixed asset investment totaled ¥2.946 billion, retail sales totaled ¥13.440 billion, and the subdistrict's tax revenue totaled ¥4.581 billion.

Guancheng Subdistrict's three major business districts are: West Gate Avenue, Diwang Square, and Yujing Square CBD.

Education 
Within Guancheng Subdistrict, there is 1 undergraduate university, 3 vocational secondary schools, 3 standard secondary schools, 1 technical vocational school, 1 special education school, 8 primary schools, 7 kindergartens, 1 sports academy, and 17 private schools.

Notable educational institutions within Guancheng Subdistrict include:
Dongguan University of Technology's Guangcheng Campus
 Dongguan Middle School
 Dongguan Experimental High School
 Dongguan Middle School—Junior High School
 Dongguan Keyuan High School
 Dongguan Bubugao Primary School
 Guancheng Construction of Primary School
 Guancheng Experimental Primary School
 Guancheng Central Primary School

Healthcare 
Guancheng Subdistrict is the center for medical and health services in Dongguan City. There are many large integrated medical institutions, including:
 Dongguan People's Hospital
 Dongguan Traditional Chinese Medical Hospital
 Dongguan People's Hospital of Guancheng Subdistrict
 Guancheng Hospital
 Dongguan Maria's Maternity Hospital

Cultural attractions 

 Ke Yuan, a famous garden in Guangdong.
 , located on the corner of Jiaochang Road and Guangming Road, is a stele which was built in 1541. This stele was made from bluestone with a hard texture.

 Ouge Pavilion, Established 1921, Ouge Pavilion lies on the west side of Yu Mountain in Dongguan People's Park. Ouge Arbours was in honour of Huang Chunlin, the head of Dongguan County, and was built by the local people to mark the many good works he did. In 2008, the managers of the park repaired the arbours according to its original sample and installed stone tables and stools for tourists.
 Daosheng Park

Daosheng Park was built by Zhang Jiamo, the nephew of Ke Yuan founder Zhang Jingxiu. It stands in Daofu Alley of Guancheng Subdistrict. The whole park sat northwest-to-southeast. Ju Chao and Ju Lian have lived in this park for about 10 years, where they founded the Ling-nan School of painters. The original area of Daosheng Park was about 750 kilometers. However, after hundreds of years, there were only several old and shabby houses.

Gallery

Guancheng Subdistrict is the Old Town of Dongguan City. Here are some of its sights:

References

External links
 Dongguan Middle School (东莞中学) – campus network
 Ouge Arbours (讴歌亭) Likin Storm – the story of Ouge Arbours
 Ju Chao (居巢) – official website of painter Ju Chao
 Ju Lian (居廉) – official website of painter Ju Lian
 东莞地图 – map of Dongguan City

.
Geography of Dongguan
Subdistricts of the People's Republic of China